Hlompo Modimokwane (born 3 October 1998) is a South African cricketer. He made his first-class debut for North West in the 2018–19 CSA 3-Day Provincial Cup on 18 October 2018. He made his List A debut for North West in the 2018–19 CSA Provincial One-Day Challenge on 21 October 2018.

References

External links
 

1998 births
Living people
South African cricketers
North West cricketers
Place of birth missing (living people)